Marininema halotolerans  is a Gram-positive bacterium from the genus of Marininema which has been isolated from marine sediments from the Little Andaman Island from the Indian Ocean.

References

External links
Type strain of Marininema halotolerans at BacDive -  the Bacterial Diversity Metadatabase	

Bacillales
Bacteria described in 2013